Urylee Leonardos (May 14, 1910 – April 25, 1986) was an American vocalist and actress who appeared frequently on Broadway. She has the distinction of being the first black performer to understudy and go on for a Latina in a Broadway production. She filled in for Yma Sumac in the role of Princess Najla in the 1951 production of Flahooley.

Biography
Leonardos appeared in Mike Todd's Gay New Orleans revue at the 1939 World's Fair in New York City.  Later that year, she had a small role on Broadway in The Male Animal.

Her big break came in 1943, when she was cast in the musical Carmen Jones.  Initially cast in a small role, Leonardo took over the lead in the 1946 revival of the production.

Leonardos filled in for Yma Sumac as Princess Najla in the 1951 production, Flahooley.  It was the first time that a black performer stepped into a role played by a Latina on Broadway. She also played the female lead in the 1953 revival of Porgy and Bess.

Selected credits

Theatre

Motion Pictures

References

External links
 

1910 births
1986 deaths
African-American actresses
Actresses from Charleston, South Carolina
American television actresses
American stage actresses
American film actresses
20th-century American actresses
Musicians from Charleston, South Carolina
20th-century African-American women singers